The 2002–03 season was the 84th season in the history of Montpellier HSC and the club's second consecutive season in the top flight of French football. In addition to the domestic league, Montpellier participated in this season's editions of the Coupe de France and Coupe de la Ligue.

Pre-season and friendlies

During the season, Montpellier played eight friendlies and training matches including one against a national team.

Competitions

Overall record

Ligue 1

League table

Results summary

Results by round

Matches

Coupe de France

Coupe de la Ligue

Statistics 

Source:

References

Montpellier HSC seasons
Montpellier